Methil railway station served the village of Methil, Fife, Scotland, from 1887 to 1955 on the Leven Extension Railway.

History 
The station was opened on 5 May 1887 by the Leven Extension Railway. To the south was the goods yard, which has a large goods shed, and further to the south was Methil Yard, which had connections to Methil Docks. Initially it had nine sidings and a branch line which served Denbeath Colliery. In 1900, a second dock siding opened as well as eight more pairs of sidings. A third dock siding opened in 1912. The yard had around seventeen sidings at this point which had space for 516 wagons. The station closed to passengers on 10 January 1955 but it still remained open as a goods station and occasionally used for football excursions in 1958. Methil Yard closed to general goods in 1980 but remained open for coal until 1985.

References

External links
l Railscot - Methil

Disused railway stations in Fife
Former North British Railway stations
Railway stations in Great Britain opened in 1887
Railway stations in Great Britain closed in 1955
1887 establishments in Scotland
1955 disestablishments in Scotland
Levenmouth